The United States Amateur Tennis Championships was the top American tennis tournament for amateur players. It was organized by the United States Tennis Association.

The tournament began in 1968 to create an amateur championship in addition to the US Open that was designated a professional event that year for the first time. That first year UCLA student Arthur Ashe won the US Amateur and then went on to win the US Open the same year. He is the only player to win both events in the same year and no one has come close since. In the years that followed, many winners received a wild card entry into the US Open qualifying event. 

From 1971 to 1980 the tournament was not held, but then in 1981 was started again. In addition to Ashe, numerous other well-known players have won the event, including former world #1 doubles player Jim Pugh and former world #4 singles player Roscoe Tanner.

In 1995, the tournament changed its name to the Intercollegiate Tennis Association Summer Championships.

Winners

External links
ITA Tennis Site
Tennis Hall of Fame Arthur Ashe Bio

Defunct tennis tournaments in the United States
Grass court tennis tournaments